James Young is the tenth comedy album released by Northern Irish comedian and actor James Young and the first to be released posthumously.

The album cover features a picture taken by Stanley Matchett of Young at his home, 'Camelot', in Ballyhalbert. The back cover features sleeve notes written by Young's former partner Jack Hudson.

It is a mix of Young's sketches, serious monologues and comedy songs.

Track listing

Side 1
 Meet James Young 
 Smithfield Market 
 Orange Lily
 Behind The Barricades 
 The Presentation

Side 2
 Gerry's Walls
 A Boy Finds Out the Facts
 The Ballymena Cowboy 
 T.V. Commercial
 I Believe in Ulster

Side 3
 I Married a Papish 
 Carpenter Crimmond 
 The Stranger

Side 4
 The Ould Blackman 
 Wee Davy 
 Slum Clearance 
 The Feud

References

1975 compilation albums
James Young (comedian) albums